Blooper is an American indie and garage rock band from Seattle, consisting of Adriano Santi, Chris Mac and Chris Quirk. The band plays a style of garage rock with strong surf music and powerpop influences. Blooper was formed in 2011 and have so far released 4 EPs.

Background
The band started in 2011 as a solo project by Santi, who was soon joined by Quirk and original bassist Darrin Ruder. This formation released the EPs "Go Away" (Ind., 2012), "Long Distance" (Manic Pop!, 2013) and "So Very Small" (Jigsaw, 2014), which garnered them attention in the local press and radio stations. Ruder left the band for personal reasons at the end of 2014, being replaced by Chris Mac, formerly of Math and Physics Club.

Members
Current members
 Adriano Santi – Guitar and Vocals
 Chris Mac – Bass Guitar and Vocals 
 Chris Quirk – Drums

Discography
EPs
 Ballard Ave. EP (July 2011, Independent)
 Go Away (May 2012, Independent)
 Long Distance (January 2013, Manic Pop! Records)
 So Very Small (July 2014, Jigsaw Records)

References

External links
 Official Site
 Bandcamp
 Official Facebook page

Musical groups from Washington (state)
2011 establishments in Washington (state)
Musical groups established in 2011